William John Walker (1899–1929) was an English footballer who played in the Football League for Stoke and Walsall.

Career
Walker was born in Great Wyrley and started playing football with Cannock Town before joining Stoke in 1924. He spent two seasons at the Victoria Ground both of which were poor seasons as Stoke were relegated to the third tier in 1925–26. Walker played 36 times for Stoke scoring once against Stockport County in January 1926. After Stoke's relegation Walker left the club for Walsall.

Career statistics

References

English footballers
Cannock Town F.C. players
Stoke City F.C. players
Walsall F.C. players
English Football League players
1899 births
1929 deaths
Association football wing halves
Date of birth missing
Date of death missing